Dongcheon-dong is a dong located in Suji-gu, Yongin, South Korea. In 2010, it was home to around 31,000 individuals.

Education

Elementary schools
 Dongcheon Elementary School
 Son'gok Elementary School
 Hanbit Elementary School

Middle schools
 Son'gok Middle School
 Yongin Hanbit Middle School

External links
 Official website of Dongcheon-dong

References

Yongin
Neighbourhoods in South Korea